Milt Jackson Quintet Live at the Village Gate is a live album by vibraphonist Milt Jackson featuring Jimmy Heath recorded in 1963 at The Village Gate and released on the Riverside label.

Reception
The Allmusic review by Scott Yanow awarded the album 4 stars stating "Milt Jackson is in typically swinging form".

Track listing
All compositions by Milt Jackson except as indicated
 "Bags of Blues" - 7:44 
 "Little Girl Blue" (Lorenz Hart, Richard Rodgers) - 4:27 
 "Gemini" (Jimmy Heath) - 9:41 
 "Gerri's Blues" - 7:41 
 "Time After Time" (Sammy Cahn, Jule Styne) - 4:33 
 "Ignunt Oil" - 7:05 
 "Willow Weep for Me" (Ann Ronell) - 4:45 Bonus track on CD reissue 
 "All Members" (Heath) - 7:09 Bonus track on CD reissue  
Recorded The Village Gate in New York City on December 9, 1963

Personnel
Milt Jackson – vibes
Jimmy Heath - tenor saxophone - (except 2,5 and 7)
Hank Jones - piano
Bob Cranshaw - bass
Albert Heath - drums

References 

Riverside Records albums
Milt Jackson albums
1963 albums
Albums produced by Orrin Keepnews
Albums recorded at the Village Gate